Leonida Bissolati (20 February 1857 in Cremona – 6 May 1920 in Rome) was a leading exponent of the Italian socialist movement at the turn of the nineteenth century.

Biography 

He was born from the liaison of Paolina Bergamaschi, a nurse, with Stefano Bissolati, a priest who left the Church in 1859, at age 37, and later became director of Cremona's city library and a noted scholar.  At birth the child was named Leonida Bergamaschi; his name was changed at age 18, when Stefano Bissolati legally adopted him (after marrying Paolina in 1868, five years after she had become a widow). 
With this family background, it is scarcely surprising that Leonida turned to leftist politics as a student at the University of Bologna, where he earned his law degree at the age of 20.  Returning to Cremona, he practiced law as an attorney and published many articles in journals and newspapers.  In 1876 he was elected to the City Council of Cremona, at  first in the ranks of the Radicals, then gradually moving closer to the Socialists. Altogether he served in the council for 18 years, notably by being in charge of Public Education.  He married Ginevra Coggi, who soon fell chronically ill and died in 1894; later, his soulmate and companion was Carolina Cassola, whom he eventually married in 1913.

From 1889 to 1895, Bissolati organized peasant demonstrations and the social struggle for better living conditions in the countryside.  In 1889 he founded  L'eco del popolo (The Echo of the People), which subsequently became the local organ in Cremona of the  Italian Socialist Party (PSI).  He also published a partial translation of the Communist Manifesto of  Marx and  Engels. 
In 1896 he became director of  Avanti! (Forward!), the official organ of the PSI, relinquishing this post in 1903, only to resume it from 1908 to 1910.

Meanwhile Bissolati was active as a legislator. In 1897 he was elected to the Chamber of Deputies of the Italian Parliament, representing the college of Cremona.  His refusal  to oppose the war on Turkey for the conquest of Libya triggered his resignation as socialist Member of Parliament in February 1912; five months later he was expelled from the PSI. He promptly went on to found the Italian Reformist Socialist Party (Partito Socialista Riformista Italiano), with Ivanoe Bonomi (a future prime minister) and Angiolo Cabrini.

Bissolati strongly advocated Italy's entry into World War I on the side of the Triple Entente, while his former socialist friends favored neutrality. He volunteered for the front and served with distinction, receiving a medal. Back in Rome, he served in two successive Italian Governments (those headed by Paolo Boselli and Vittorio Emanuele Orlando). He was responsible for supplying troops as well as for liaising between cabinet and the generals.

At the end of the war, Bissolati supported the League of Nations and Woodrow Wilson's principle of self-determination in the settling of the new national borders. This infuriated the nationalists, bent on annexing to Italy sizeable areas inhabited by Germans and Slavs in the Northeast.  Attacked from all sides, he resigned from the government and withdrew from politics in December 1918, although subsequently he met with Woodrow Wilson and urged that Italy not be given Fiume or the Dalmatian Coast. He died in Rome of a post-operative infection.

In August 2018, the regular Scottish Rite Masonic Lodge of Cremona commemorated Bissolati as one of his notable members. On 18 December 1974, the "Leonida Bissolati" Lodge, a Masonic center affiliated with the Grand Orient of Italy and named in his honour, was founded in Cremona.

References

Bibliography 
 
 

1857 births
1920 deaths
Politicians from Cremona
Italian Socialist Party politicians
Italian Reformist Socialist Party politicians
Government ministers of Italy
Deputies of Legislature XIX of the Kingdom of Italy
Deputies of Legislature XX of the Kingdom of Italy
Deputies of Legislature XXI of the Kingdom of Italy
Deputies of Legislature XXII of the Kingdom of Italy
Deputies of Legislature XXIII of the Kingdom of Italy
Deputies of Legislature XXIV of the Kingdom of Italy
Deputies of Legislature XXV of the Kingdom of Italy
Italian journalists
Italian Freemasons